Ustad Nusrat Fateh Ali Khan  (born Pervez Fateh Ali Khan; 13 October 1948 – 16 August 1997) was a Pakistani singer, songwriter, and music director. He was primarily a singer of qawwali — a form of Sufi devotional music. Sometimes called the "Shahenshah-e-Qawwali" (the King of Kings of Qawwali), he is considered by The New York Times to be the greatest qawwali singer of his generation. He was described as the fourth greatest singer of all time by LA Weekly in 2016. He was known for his vocal abilities and could perform at a high level of intensity for several hours. Khan is widely credited with introducing qawwali music to international audiences.

Born in Lyallpur (Faisalabad), Khan had his first public performance at the age of 15, at his father's chelum. He became the head of the family qawwali party in 1971, and brought his unique style of sargam, khayal, and rhythm to his family's legacy. He was signed by Oriental Star Agencies, Birmingham, England, in the early 1980s. Khan went on to release movie scores and albums in Europe, India, Japan, Pakistan, and the U.S. He engaged in collaborations and experiments with Western artists, becoming a well-known world music artist. He toured extensively, performing in over 40 countries. In addition to popularising qawwali music, he also had a profound impact on contemporary South Asian popular music, including Pakistani pop, Indian pop, and Bollywood music.

Biography

Early life and career 

Khan was born into a Punjabi Muslim family in Lyallpur (modern-day Faisalabad), Punjab, Pakistan, in 1948. His family originates from Basti Sheikh Darvesh, who settled in Jalandhar, Punjab in present-day India. His ancestors learned music and singing there and adopted it as a profession. He was the fifth child and first son of Fateh Ali Khan, a musicologist, vocalist, instrumentalist, and qawwal. Khan's family, which included four older sisters and a younger brother, Farrukh Fateh Ali Khan, grew up in central Faisalabad. The tradition of qawwali in the family had passed down through successive generations for almost 600 years. Initially, his father did not want Khan to follow the family's vocation. He had his heart set on Nusrat choosing a much more respectable career path and becoming a doctor or engineer because he felt qawwali artists had low social status. However, Khan showed such an aptitude for and interest in qawwali, that his father finally relented.

In 1971, after the death of his uncle Mubarak Ali Khan, Khan became the official leader of the family qawwali party and the party became known as Nusrat Fateh Ali Khan, Mujahid Mubarak Ali Khan & Party. Khan's first public performance as the leader of the qawwali party was at a studio recording broadcast as part of an annual music festival organized by Radio Pakistan, known as Jashn-e-Baharan. Khan sang mainly in Urdu and Punjabi and occasionally in Persian, Braj Bhasha, and Hindi. His first major hit in Pakistan was the song Haq Ali Ali, which was performed in a traditional style and with traditional instrumentation. The song featured restrained use of Khan's sargam improvisations.

Later career

In the summer of 1985, Khan performed at the World of Music, Arts and Dance (WOMAD) festival in London. He performed in Paris in 1985 and 1988. He first visited Japan in 1987, at the invitation of the Japan Foundation. He performed at the 5th Asian Traditional Performing Art Festival in Japan. He also performed at Brooklyn Academy of Music, New York, in 1989, earning him admiration from the American audience.

Khan, throughout his career, had great understanding with many south Asian singers such as Alam Lohar, Noor Jehan, A. R. Rahman, Asha Bhosle, Javed Akhtar, and Lata Mangeshkar.

In the 1992 to 1993 academic year, Khan was a Visiting Artist in the Ethnomusicology department at the University of Washington, Seattle, Washington, United States.

In 1988, Khan teamed up with Peter Gabriel on the soundtrack to The Last Temptation of Christ, which led to Khan being signed to Gabriel's Real World label. He would go on to release five albums of traditional qawwali through Real World, along with the more experimental albums Mustt Mustt (1990), Night Song (1996), and the posthumous remix album Star Rise (1997).

In 1989, commissioned by Oriental Star Agencies Ltd in Birmingham UK, Khan collaborated at Zella Recording Studios with composer Andrew Kristy and producer Johnny Haynes on a series of 'fusion' tracks which propelled Nusrat Fateh Ali Khan and Party into the Channel 4 Christmas Special of "Big World Café." While in the UK in 1989, Khan and party performed Sikh devotional music at a Sikh Gurdwara in Slough, continuing a tradition of Muslims performing hymns at Sikh temples.

Further to this in 1990, the BBC devoted an entire program on Network East to this collaboration, and Big World Café subsequently invited Khan, Andrew Kristy and violinist Nigel Kennedy to perform Allah Hoo live on the show.  A live UK tour containing these new fusion tracks was made in 1990.

Khan's experimental work for Real World, which featured his collaborations with the Canadian guitarist Michael Brook, spurred on several further collaborations with a number of other Western composers and rock musicians. One of the most noteworthy of these collaborations came in 1995, when Khan grouped with Pearl Jam's lead singer Eddie Vedder on two songs for the soundtrack to Dead Man Walking. Khan also provided vocals for The Prayer Cycle which was put together by Jonathan Elias, but died before the tracks could be completed. Alanis Morissette was brought in to sing with his unfinished vocals. In 2002, Gabriel included Khan's vocals on the track "Signal to Noise" on his album Up.

Khan's album Intoxicated Spirit was nominated for a Grammy Award for Best Traditional Folk Album in 1997. That same year, his album Night Song was also nominated for a Grammy Award for Best World Music Album.

Khan contributed songs to, and performed in, several Pakistani films. Shortly before his death, he composed music for three Bollywood films, which includes the film Aur Pyaar Ho Gaya, in which he also sang for "Koi Jaane Koi Na Jaane" on-screen with the lead pair, and "Zindagi Jhoom Kar." He also composed music for Kartoos where he sang for "Ishq Da Rutba", and "Bahaa Na Aansoo", alongside Udit Narayan. He died shortly before the movie's release. His final music composition for Bollywood was for the movie Kachche Dhaage where he sang in "Iss Shaan-E-Karam Ka Kya Kehna." The movie was released in 1999, two years after his death. The two singing sisters of Bollywood, Asha Bhosle and Lata Mangeshkar sang for the songs he composed in his brief stint in Bollywood. He also sang "Saya Bhi Saath Jab Chhod Jaye" for Sunny Deol's movie Dillagi. The song was released in 1999, two years after Khan's death. He also sang "Dulhe Ka Sehra" from the Bollywood movie Dhadkan which was released in 2000.

Khan contributed the song "Gurus of Peace" to the 1997 album Vande Mataram, composed by A. R. Rahman, and released to celebrate the 50th anniversary of India's independence. As a posthumous tribute, Rahman later released an album titled Gurus of Peace which included "Allah Hoo" by Khan. Rahman's 2007 song "Tere Bina" for the film Guru was also composed as a tribute to Khan.

Shaukat Khanum Hospital fundraising event
Khan was the main performer at Imran Khan's charity appeal concert at the InterContinental London Park Lane Hotel on December 3, 1992 to raise funds for Shaukat Khanum Memorial Cancer Hospital and Research Centre, a cancer hospital built in Imran's mothers name which provides free services.

Other celebrities were also in the audience including Peter Gabriel, Elizabeth Hurley, Mick Jagger, and Amitabh Bachchan.

Death

Khan was overweight in his later years; various reports stated that he weighed over 137 kilograms (300 pounds). He had been seriously ill for several months, according to a spokesperson at his U.S. label, American Recordings. After travelling to London from his native Pakistan for treatment for liver and kidney problems, he was rushed from the airport to the Cromwell Hospital in London, where he died of a sudden cardiac arrest on 16 August 1997, aged 48. His body was repatriated to Faisalabad, and his funeral was a public affair. His wife, Naheed Nusrat, moved to Canada after the death of her husband, where she died on 13 September 2013 in Mississauga, Ontario. Khan's musical legacy is now carried forward by his nephews, Rahat Fateh Ali Khan and Rizwan-Muazzam.

Awards and titles

Khan is widely considered to be the most important qawwal in history. In 1987, he received the President of Pakistan's Award for Pride of Performance for his contribution to Pakistani music. In 1995, he received the UNESCO Music Prize. In 1996 he was awarded Grand Prix des Amériques at Montreal World Film Festival for exceptional contribution to the art of cinema. In the same year, Khan received the Arts and Culture Prize of the Fukuoka Asian Culture Prizes. In Japan, he was also remembered as the Budai or "Singing Buddha."

In 1997, he was nominated for two Grammy Awards, for Best Traditional Folk Album and Best World Music Album. In 1998, he was awarded PTV Life Time Achievement Award. As of 2001, he held the Guinness World Record for the "Most Qawwali Recordings", having recorded over 125 qawwali albums before his death. In 2005, Khan posthumously received the "Legends" award at the UK Asian Music Awards. Time magazine's issue of 6 November 2006, "60 Years of Asian Heroes", lists him as one of the top 12 artists and thinkers in the last 60 years. He also appeared on NPR's 50 great voices list in 2010. In August 2010 he was included in CNN's list of the twenty most iconic musicians from the past fifty years. In 2008, Khan was listed in 14th position in UGO's list of the best singers of all time.

Many honorary titles were bestowed upon Khan during his 25-year music career. He was given the title of Ustad (the master) after performing classical music at a function in Lahore on the anniversary of his father's death.

Khan was listed at position 91 on Rolling Stone's 200 Best Singers Of All Time list, which was published on January 1, 2023.

Tributes, legacy and influence

Khan is often credited as one of the progenitors of "world music." Widely acclaimed for his spiritual charisma and distinctive exuberance, he was one of the first and most important artists to popularize qawwali, then considered an "arcane religious tradition", to Western audiences. His powerful vocal presentations, which could last up to 10 hours, brought forth a craze for his music all over Europe. Alexandra A. Seno of Asiaweek wrote:

Nusrat Fateh Ali Khan's voice was otherworldly. For 25 years, his mystical songs transfixed millions. It was not long enough ... He performed qawwali, which means wise or philosophical utterance, as nobody else of his generation did. His vocal range, talent for improvisation and sheer intensity were unsurpassed.

Jeff Buckley cited Khan as a major influence, saying of him "He's my Elvis", and performing the first few minutes of Khan's "Yeh Jo Halka Halka Suroor Hai" (including vocals) at live concerts. Many other artists have also cited Khan as an influence, such as Nadia Ali, Zayn Malik, Malay, Peter Gabriel, A. R. Rahman, Sheila Chandra, Alim Qasimov, Eddie Vedder, and Joan Osborne, among others. His music was also appreciated by singers such as Mick Jagger, socialites such as Parmeshwar Godrej, actors such as Amitabh Bachchan, Trudie Styler, Sean Penn, Susan Sarandon, and Tim Robbins, and authors such as Sam Harris, who cited Khan as one of his favourite musicians.

Paul Williams picked a concert performance by Khan for inclusion in his 2000 book The 20th Century's Greatest Hits: a 'top-40' list, in which he devotes a chapter each to what he considers the top 40 artistic achievements of the 20th century in any field (including art, movies, music, fiction, non-fiction, science-fiction).
The Derek Trucks Band covers Khan's songs on two of their studio albums. Their 2002 album Joyful Noise includes a cover of "Maki Madni", which features a guest performance by Rahat Fateh Ali Khan, Khan's nephew. 2005's Songlines includes a medley of two of Khan's songs, "Sahib Teri Bandi" and "Maki Madni." This medley first appeared on the band's live album Live at Georgia Theatre (2004).

In 2004, a tribute band called Brooklyn Qawwali Party (formerly Brook's Qawwali Party) was formed in New York City by percussionist Brook Martinez to perform the music of Khan. The 13-piece group still performs mostly instrumental jazz versions of Khan's qawwalis, using the instruments conventionally associated with jazz rather than those associated with qawwali.

In 2007, electronic music producer and performer Gaudi, after being granted access to back catalogue recordings from Rehmat Gramophone House (Khan's former label in Pakistan), released an album of entirely new songs composed around existing vocals. The album, Dub Qawwali, was released by Six Degrees Records. It reached no. 2 in the iTunes US Chart, no. 4 in the UK and was the no. 1 seller in Amazon.com's Electronic Music section for a period. It also earned Gaudi a nomination for the BBC's World Music Awards 2008.

On 13 October 2015, Google celebrated Khan's 67th birthday with a doodle on its homepage in six countries, including India, Pakistan, Japan, Sweden, Ghana, and Kenya, calling him the person "who opened the world's ears to the rich, hypnotic sounds of the Sufis." "Thanks to his legendary voice, Khan helped bring 'world music' to the world," said Google.

In February 2016, a rough mix of a song recorded by Red Hot Chili Peppers in 1998 called "Circle of the Noose" was leaked to the internet. Guitarist Dave Navarro described the song saying, "It's pop in the sense of verse, chorus, verse, chorus, bridge, hook. I really love it and we use a loop of Nusrat Fateh Ali Khan. It's really nice. The best way I can describe it is it's like pepped- up '60s folk with '90s ideals, but I would hate to label it as folk because it's not, it moves."

The 2018 book The Displaced Children of Displaced Children (Eyewear Publishing) by Pakistani American poet Faisal Mohyuddin includes the poem "Faisalabad", a tribute to Khan and to the city of Khan's birth. "Faisalabad" includes a number or references to Khan, including the excerpt, "There are no better cures for homesickness / than Nusrat's qawwalis, / except when you're a mother / and you find comfort in the unfolding / hours of a child's existence." The poem was first published by Narrative Magazine in Spring 2017.

Popular culture

One of Khan's famous qawwali songs, "Tere Bin Nahin Lagda" ("I am restless without you"), appeared on two of his 1996 albums, Sorrows Vol. 69 and Sangam (as "Tere Bin Nahin Lagda Dil"), the latter a collaborative album with Indian lyricist Javed Akhtar; Sangam sold over 1million copies in India. Lata Mangeshkar recorded a cover version called "Tere Bin Nahin Jeena" for Kachche Dhaage, starring Ajay Devgn, Saif Ali Khan and Manisha Koirala. Composed by Nusrat Fateh Ali Khan, the Kachche Dhaage soundtrack album sold 3million units in India. British-Indian producer Bally Sagoo released a remix of "Tere Bin Nahin Lagda", which was later featured in the 2002 British film Bend It Like Beckham, starring Parminder Nagra and Keira Knightley. A cover version called "Tere Bin" was recorded by Rahat Fateh Ali Khan with Asees Kaur for the 2018 Bollywood film Simmba, starring Ranveer Singh and Sara Ali Khan.

Nusrat Fateh Ali Khan's music had a big impact on Bollywood music, inspiring numerous Indian musicians working in Bollywood since the late 1980s. For example, he inspired A. R. Rahman and Javed Akhtar, both of whom he collaborated with. However, there were many hit filmi songs from other Indian music directors that plagiarised Khan's music. Viju Shah's hit song "Tu Cheez Badi Hai Mast Mast" in Mohra (1994) was plagiarised from Khan's popular qawwali song "Dam Mast Qalandar."

Despite the significant number of hit Bollywood songs plagiarised from his music, he was reportedly tolerant towards the plagiarism. In one interview, he jokingly gave "Best Copy" awards to Viju Shah and Anu Malik. In his defense, Malik claimed that he loved Khan's music and was actually showing admiration by using his tunes. However, Khan was reportedly aggrieved when Malik turned his spiritual "Allah Hoo, Allah Hoo" into "I Love You, I Love You" in Auzaar. Khan said "he has taken my devotional song Allahu and converted it into I love you. He should at least respect my religious songs."

His music also appears on soundtracks for Hollywood films such as The Last Temptation of Christ (1988), Natural Born Killers (1994) and Dead Man Walking (1995).

Discography

Sales

See also

 List of Pakistani musicians
 List of Pakistani qawwali singers
 Filmi qawwali

References

Further reading 

 Ahmed Aqil Rubi (1992). Nusrat Fateh Ali Khan: A living legend . Words of Wisdom
 Baud, Pierre-Alain (2008). Nusrat Fateh Ali Khan: The Messenger of Qawwali. Editions Demi-Lune. A biography of Nusrat.
 Varun Soni (2014). Natural Mystics: The Prophetic Lives of Bob Marley and Nusrat Fateh Ali Khan. Figueroa Press. Depicts Religious aspects of Artists lives, and how they used technology.
 Baud, Pierre Alain (2015). Nusrat: The Voice of Faith. Harper Collins India. A biography of Nusrat.

External links

 Article with brief 1993 interview (edwebproject.org)
 
 NPR Audio Report: Nusrat Fateh Ali Khan: The Voice Of Pakistan
 

 
1948 births
1997 deaths
20th-century composers
20th-century Pakistani male singers
Bollywood playback singers
EMI Records artists
Harmonium players
Nigar Award winners
Pakistani classical singers
Pakistani film score composers
Pakistani playback singers
Pakistani folk singers
Pakistani male singers
Pakistani ghazal singers
Pakistani music educators
Pakistani qawwali singers
Pakistani world music musicians
Singers from Faisalabad
Musicians from Punjab, Pakistan
Pakistani Muslims
Performers of Sufi music
Persian-language singers
Punjabi-language singers
Real World Records artists
Recipients of the Pride of Performance
Tabla players
Urdu-language singers
Virgin Records artists
Punjabi people
20th-century Pakistani singers
Nusrat
Male film score composers
People from Faisalabad
Pakistani tenors
PTV Award winners